Goodmanham (historically Godmundingaham, the home of the people of Godmund mentioned in the year 627 in Bede's Historia ecclesiastica gentis Anglorum ) is a small village and civil parish in the East Riding of Yorkshire, England. The village is situated on the Yorkshire Wolds Way National Trail, a long-distance footpath.
According to the 2011 UK Census, Goodmanham parish had a population of 244, an increase on the 2001 UK Census figure of 218.

The village is built in a favourable position on a south-facing slope of the Yorkshire Wolds between two streams. It has a copious supply of water from numerous springs and naturally occurring limestone for building. The land is extraordinarily fertile in this region and people have lived here since prehistoric times.

History

The earliest traces of settlement are from the Stone Age. There are many ancient burial sites. The boundaries of the village lie along the lines of ancient earthworks and these are evidence that it was a prehistoric place of worship. Near the western boundary of the village lies one of the most ancient roads of Britain, later adopted by the Romans. Settlement at this time is indicated by finds of Samian ware and coins of the period. Later in Saxon times, after the recall of the Roman legions, the village reached a position of great importance and fame. It became the site of the high shrine of Anglo Saxon Northumbria, a great temple. The dramatic overthrow of this temple in 627 AD by the high priest Coifi upon the conversion of King Edwin of Northumbria is related by St Bede in his History of the English Church and People (Historia ecclesiastica gentis Anglorum).

"I have known long since" [Coifi] said, "that there is nothing in this religion that we have professed...the more I sought the truth of it the less I found...this can give us life salvation and eternal happiness...I advise that we burn the useless sanctuary – and who better than myself as an example?" 

So saying, he borrowed a war stallion and a spear ("and nom his spere on hond") both of which were forbidden to him as a priest. He galloped to the temple and flung the weapon into the temple; profaning and defiling it. The people witnessing this spectacle believed he was mad. He then ordered that the temple and all its enclosures be burned to the ground.

Local tradition has it that the ride was from the king's summer camp at Londesborough, which is two miles from Goodmanham.

Although Goodmanham is very near to York, the capital of Viking England, we have no information about Goodmanham from that period. It is next found as a listing in the Domesday Book produced under William the Conqueror at the time of the Norman conquest. A few names of resident farmers are given: Colgri, Orm, Norman, William de Coleville. These names show the presence of Normans now occupying the land.

The church of All Hallows now stands on or near the site of the original pagan temple. This church dates from around 1130 AD and replaces an earlier one of wooden construction built in the Saxon period. The church was designated a Grade I listed building in 1986 and is now recorded in the National Heritage List for England, maintained by Historic England.
A tumulus, located to the south-west of the village, is also supposed to contain ruins. One of the many sacred wells in Britain dedicated to St Helena is located nearby.

In 1823 Baines' History, Directory and Gazetteer of the County of York gave an alternative Goodmanham name of "Godmundin Graham". The village was a parish in the Wapentake of Harthill, and partly in the Liberty of St Peter. Population at the time was 220, with occupations including fifteen farmers, a boot & shoe maker, a corn miller, a shoemaker, a wheelwright, a blacksmith who was also the parish clerk, and the licensed victualler of The Star public house. A carrier operated between the village and Market Weighton and Beverley once a week.

Notable people
 Richard Foster  (20 August 1856 – 5 January 1932). He emigrated to South Australia in 1880. Held various posts including Commissioner for Public Works, Minister for Industry, Minister for Works and Railways.
 William Featherby (18 August 1888 – 20 November 1958), county cricketer for Yorkshire, lived and worked locally to Goodmanham all his life. He is buried in the churchyard.

References

External links 

  Goodmanham Parish Council's Website
 Goodmanham on Market Weighton's website
 
 History of the Kingdom of Northumbria – Edwin's conversion
 

Villages in the East Riding of Yorkshire
Civil parishes in the East Riding of Yorkshire